Adunații may refer to several places in Romania:

Adunații-Copăceni, a commune in Giurgiu County
Adunații Teiului, a village in Tâmna Commune, Mehedinți County
Adunații Sârbeni, the former name for Sârbeni Commune, Teleorman County

See also
 Adunați, a commune in Prahova County, Romania